The brown-headed cowbird (Molothrus ater) is a small, obligate brood parasitic icterid native to temperate and subtropical North America. It is a permanent resident in the southern parts of its range; northern birds migrate to the southern United States and Mexico in winter, returning to their summer habitat around March or April.

Taxonomy
The brown-headed cowbird was described by the French polymath Georges-Louis Leclerc, Comte de Buffon in 1775 in his Histoire Naturelle des Oiseaux from a specimen collected in the Carolinas. The bird was also illustrated in a hand-colored plate engraved by François-Nicolas Martinet in the Planches Enluminées D'Histoire Naturelle, which was produced under the supervision of Edme-Louis Daubenton to accompany Buffon's text. Neither the plate caption nor Buffon's description included a scientific name, but in 1783, Dutch naturalist Pieter Boddaert coined the binomial name Oriolus ater in his catalogue of the Planches Enluminées. The brown-headed cowbird is now placed in the genus Molothrus that was introduced by  English naturalist William John Swainson in 1832 with the brown-headed cowbird as the type species. The genus name combines the Ancient Greek mōlos meaning "struggle" or "battle" with thrōskō meaning "to sire" or "to impregnate". The specific name ater is Latin for "dull black". The English name "cowbird", first recorded in 1839, refers to this species often being seen near cattle.

Three subspecies are recognised:
 M. a. artemisiae Grinnell, 1909 – interior west Canada and west USA
 M. a. obscurus (Gmelin, JF, 1789) – coastal Alaska, Canada, USA, and northwest Mexico
 M. a. ater (Boddaert, 1783) – southeast Canada, east and central USA, and northeast Mexico

Description

The brown-headed cowbird is typical for an icterid in general shape, but is distinguished by its finch-like head and beak and  smaller size. The adult male is iridescent black in color with a brown head. The adult female is slightly smaller and is dull grey with a pale throat and very fine streaking on the underparts.

Distribution and habitat

The species lives in open or semiopen country, and often travels in flocks, sometimes mixed with red-winged blackbirds (particularly in spring) and bobolinks (particularly in fall), as well as common grackles or European starlings. These birds forage on the ground, often following grazing animals such as horses and cattle to catch insects stirred up by the larger animals. They mainly eat seeds and insects.

Before European settlement,  brown-headed cowbirds followed bison herds across the prairies. Their population expanded with the clearing of forested areas and the introduction of new grazing animals by settlers across North America. They are now commonly seen at suburban birdfeeders.

In 2012 Brown-headed cowbirds positive for West Nile Virus were found in Northwest Riverside County, CA

Behavior and ecology

Brood parasitism 

The brown-headed cowbird is an obligate brood parasite; it lays its eggs in the nests of other small passerines (perching birds), particularly those that build cup-like nests. The brown-headed cowbird eggs have been documented in nests of at least 220 host species, including hummingbirds and raptors. More than 140 different species of birds are known to have raised young cowbirds. The young cowbird is fed by the host parents at the expense of their own young. Brown-headed cowbird females can lay up to 36 eggs in a season.

Host response
Some host species, such as the house finch, feed their young a vegetarian diet. This is unsuitable for young brown-headed cowbirds, meaning few survive to fledge. Accepting a cowbird egg and rearing a cowbird chick can be costly to a host species. In the American redstart, nests parasitized by cowbirds were found to have a higher rate of predation, likely due in part to the loud begging calls by the cowbird nestling, but also partly explained by the fact that nests likely to be parasitized are also more likely to be preyed upon.

Unlike the common cuckoo, the brown-headed cowbird is not divided into gentes whose eggs imitate those of a particular host. Host species sometimes notice the cowbird egg, with different hosts reacting to the egg in different ways. Some, like the blue-grey gnatcatcher, abandon their nest, losing their own eggs as well. Others, like the American yellow warbler, bury the foreign egg under nest material, where it perishes. The brown thrasher physically ejects the egg from the nest. Experiments with grey catbirds, a known cowbird host, have shown that this species rejects cowbird eggs more than 95% of the time. For this species, the cost of accepting cowbird eggs (i.e. the loss of their own eggs or nestlings through starvation or the actions of the nestling cowbird) was far higher than the cost of rejecting those eggs (i.e. where the host might conceivably eject its own egg accidentally). Brown-headed cowbird nestlings are also sometimes expelled from the nest.  Nestlings of host species can also alter their behavior in response to the presence of a cowbird nestling.

Parasite response
Song sparrow nestlings in parasitized nests alter their vocalizations in frequency and amplitude so that they resemble the cowbird nestling, and these nestlings tend to be fed equally often as nestlings in unparasitized nests. 

Brown-headed cowbirds seem to periodically check on their eggs and young after they have deposited them. Removal of the parasitic egg may trigger a retaliatory reaction termed "mafia behavior". According to one study  the cowbird returned to ransack the nests of a range of host species 56% of the time when their egg was removed. In addition, the cowbird also destroyed nests in a type of "farming behavior" to force the hosts to build new ones. The cowbirds then laid their eggs in the new nests 85% of the time.

Young cowbirds are not exposed to species-typical visual and auditory information like other birds. Despite this, they are able to develop species-typical singing, social, and breeding behaviors. Cowbird brains are wired to respond to the vocalizations of other cowbirds, allowing young to find and join flocks of their own species. These vocalizations are consistent across all cowbird populations, and serve as a sort of species-recognition password. If a young cowbird is not exposed to these "password" vocalizations by a certain age, it will mistakenly imprint on the host species.

Male behavior and reproductive success 
Social behaviors of cowbird males include aggressive, competitive singing bouts with other males and pair bonding and monogamy with females.

By manipulating demographics so juveniles only had access to females, juvenile males developed atypical social behavior; they did not engage in the typical social singing bouts with other males, did not pair bond with females, and were promiscuous. This demonstrates that  great flexibility occurs in the behavior of cowbirds, and that the social environment is extremely important in structuring their behavior. Adult males housed with juvenile males were shown to have greater reproductive success compared to adult males housed with other adult males. Being housed with juvenile males honed the reproductive skills of the adult males by providing them with a more complex social environment.

This finding was further studied by comparing the behaviors and reproductive success of males exposed to a dynamic flock, consisting of changing individuals, with males exposed to a static group of individuals. The individuals that stayed with the same group (i.e., static flock) had a stable, predictable relationship between social behavior and reproductive success; the males that sang frequently to females experienced the greatest reproductive success. The adult males that were exposed to a rotating roster of new individuals (i.e., dynamic flock) had an unpredictable relationship between social variables and reproductive success; these males were able to copulate using a much greater variety of social strategies. The males that lived in static flocks had high levels of consistency in their behaviors and reproductive success across multiple years, whereas the males in dynamic flocks experienced varying levels of dominance with other males, differing levels of singing to females, and differing levels of reproductive success.

Relationship to humans
With the expansion of its range and its parasitic behavior, the brown-headed cowbird is often regarded as a pest. People sometimes engage in cowbird control programs, with the intention of protecting species negatively impacted by the cowbirds' brood parasitism. A study of nests of Bell's vireo highlighted a potential limitation of these control programs, demonstrating that removal of cowbirds from a site may create an unintended consequence of increasing cowbird productivity on that site, because with fewer cowbirds, fewer parasitized nests are deserted, resulting in greater nest success for cowbirds.

References

External links

 
 Brown-headed cowbird Information at Animal Diversity Web
 
 Brown-headed cowbird - Molothrus ater - USGS Patuxent Bird Identification InfoCenter

Brood parasites
brown-headed cowbird
crown-headed cowbird
Birds of North America
Birds of Mexico
brown-headed cowbird
Birds of the United States
brown-headed cowbird
Extant Pleistocene first appearances